KGNW (820 AM) is a Christian radio station that operates in Seattle, Washington and is licensed to Burien, Washington having signed-on the air September 24, 1984 at 1150 AM (now KKNW) before moving to its current 820 AM dial position on January 1, 1987 thus replacing KQIN which first signed-on in 1970 at 800 AM before moving to 820 AM in 1986.

KGNW is licensed to broadcast in the HD Radio format.

As KQIN
KQIN, owned and operated by John Mowbray, was launched in 1970 as a daytime-only operation at 800 AM with a Country-Western music format competing with KAYO (now KKNW), KETO (now KPLZ) & later KMPS (now KSWD). The station changed to a Beautiful Music format in 1977 competing with such FM B/EZ stations like KEUT (now KSWD), KEZX (now KPNW-FM), KSEA (now KKWF) & KBRD (now KHTP) and also aired religious programs as well as old-time radio programs. The station changed to an Adult Contemporary music format in 1983. In 1986, the station moved to 820 AM & increased power to 50 kW Daytime & 5 kW Nighttime. Today, the KQIN calls belong to a PBS affiliated member station of Iowa Public Television in Davenport, Iowa.

Programming
Most of KGNW's programming consists of paid sermons by various Christian groups. The focus is on family-oriented, Christian encouragement and preaching. Conservative Christian talk show hosts that agree with the stations viewpoint are also a part of the lineup.

References

External links
KGNW website

GNW
GNW
Radio stations established in 1970
1970 establishments in Washington (state)
Salem Media Group properties